Plectromerus hovorei is a species of beetle in the family Cerambycidae. It was described by Nearns and Branham in 2008.

References

Cerambycinae
Beetles described in 2008